Josh Newman (born October 17, 1964) is an American politician who serves in the California State Senate. A Democrat, he represents the 29th Senate District, which encompasses parts of Los Angeles, Orange, and San Bernardino counties. He was previously recalled from the same office in June 2018.

Newman was elected to the State Senate by a very narrow margin in November 2016, providing Democrats with a ⅔ supermajority of 27 seats. In June 2018, he was successfully recalled by the voters of the 29th Senate District, and replaced by his 2016 opponent, former Republican Assemblywoman Ling Ling Chang.  In November 2020, Newman once again defeated Chang to return to the State Senate.

Prior to being elected to the State Senate, Newman was a veterans' advocate and executive director of a nonprofit for veterans.

Newman graduated from Yale University and served as an officer in the United States Army.

Career

2016 election

In Newman first election, he defeated former Irvine Mayor Sukhee Kang in the primary, then  narrowly defeated state Assemblywoman Ling Ling Chang to succeed term-limited Republican Bob Huff in the general election.

2018 recall
In June 2018, Newman was recalled from office, ostensibly for his affirmative vote on Senate Bill 1, which increased gas and diesel taxes and raised DMV registration fees in California. The recall effort was heavily pushed by influential radio personalities John and Ken. He was replaced by Republican Ling Ling Chang, whom he had defeated in the 2016 election.

2020 election
On March 4, 2019, Newman announced that he would be a candidate to return to the California State Senate in the 2020 elections.

He came in second in the primary election, defeating Democratic challenger Joseph Cho. In the general election, he won office with 51.3% of the vote to retake the seat from Chang.

Personal
Newman is Jewish. He is married and has one child.

Election results

2020

2018 (Recall)

2016

References

External links

Campaign websitel
Josh Newman on Join California
Josh Newman on Ballotpedia

1964 births
Living people
Democratic Party California state senators
People from Fullerton, California
United States Army officers
Yale University alumni
21st-century American politicians
Jewish American state legislators in California
Recalled state legislators of the United States
21st-century American Jews
Military personnel from California